General Sir Colin Halkett  (7 September 1774 – 24 September 1856) was a British Army officer who became Lieutenant Governor of Jersey.

Family
Halkett came from a military family. His father was Major General Frederick Godar Halkett and his younger brother was General Hugh Halkett.

Military career
Halkett began his military career in the Dutch Guards and served in various companies for three years, leaving as a captain in 1795.

From 1800 to 1801 he commanded Dutch troops on the Island of Guernsey. On 28 July 1803, a letter of service was issued to Major Halkett (and to Lieutenant Colonel von der Decken) empowering him "to raise a battalion of infantry with an establishment of four hundred and fifty-nine men" and offering him the rank of lieutenant colonel should he increase the number to eight hundred men. These men formed the nucleus of what was to become the King's German Legion in December 1803. On 17 November 1803, Halkett was promoted to Lieutenant Colonel and given command of the 2nd Light Infantry Battalion. This Battalion was involved in Cathcart's expeditions to Hanover, Rügen and Copenhagen.

Peninsular War & Waterloo Campaign
In 1811 he was given command of the Light Brigade of the King's German Legion. He held this command throughout the Peninsular War from Albuera to Toulouse. On 1 January 1812 he was promoted to colonel. At the Battle of Salamanca (22 July 1812), he commanded 1st Brigade of the 7th Division under Major General Hope.

Halkett was promoted to Major General on 4 June 1814.

On 18 June 1815, at the Battle of Waterloo he commanded the 5th Brigade in the 3rd Division, under the command of Major General Carl von Alten. He was wounded four times during the course of the battle.

Late in the afternoon, Wellington rode up to the 5th Brigade. The situation was desperate, and casualties were mounting. Halkett asked the Duke, 'My Lord, we are dreadfully cut up; can you not relieve us for a little while?’ 'Impossible!’ Wellington replied. 'Very well My Lord, we'll stand until the last man falls', was Halkett's answer. https://museums.calderdale.gov.uk/waterloo-online-exhibition

Governor

Halkett became Lieutenant Governor of Jersey in 1821 and was the first Lieutenant Governor to reside in the St Saviour Government House, still in use today. During this time he married Letitia Cricket, widow of Captain Tyle of the Royal Artillery. He had a son, Frederick (John) Colin Halkett, on 10 June 1826. He was promoted to lieutenant general on 22 July 1830 and appointed Commander-in-Chief of the Bombay Army in January 1832. He was Governor of the Royal Hospital Chelsea from 1849 until his death in 1856.

He was appointed colonel of the 71st Regiment of Foot on 21 September 1829. On 28 March 1838 he was removed to the 31st Regiment of Foot, and to the 45th Regiment of Foot on 12 July 1847.

Two streets in Saint Helier are named after him.

Distinctions
Britain
Knight Grand Cross of the Order of the Bath (GCB)
Gold Cross for Albuera, Salamanca, Vittoria, Nive
Waterloo Medal
Hanover
Knight Grand Cross of the Royal Guelphic Order (GCH)
Portugal
Order of the Tower and Sword, 2nd rank
Bavaria
Order of Maximilian Joseph, 2nd rank
Netherlands
Military Order of William, 2nd rank

References

Literature
N. Ludlow Beamish; History of the King's German Legion Vol 1. 1832-37 (new edition: Naval and Military Press 1997 )
N. Ludlow Beamish; History of the King's German Legion Vol 2. 1832-37 (new edition: Naval and Military Press 1997 )
Mike Chappell; The King's German Legion (2) 1812-1816. Osprey 2000

External links

|-

 

|-

|-

 

1774 births
1856 deaths
British Army generals
British Army personnel of the Napoleonic Wars
Knights Grand Cross of the Order of the Bath
Governors of Jersey
King's German Legion
Commanders-in-chief of Bombay
Recipients of the Waterloo Medal
Recipients of the Army Gold Cross
Commanders of the Military Order of Max Joseph
Knights Third Class of the Military Order of William